Tonicha "Toni" Daggert is a fictional character from the British ITV soap opera, Emmerdale. She is played by actress Kerry Stacey.

Casting

Stacey's casting was one of three new signings announced for Emmerdale in November 2005. Toni was introduced as the cousin of Danny Daggert (Cleveland Campbell), the already established character.

In November 2006, it was reported Stacey had quit the show.

Storylines
While on holiday in Portugal, Toni meets Paddy Kirk (Dominic Brunt) and agrees to return to Emmerdale with him and pretend to be his internet girlfriend, "Fireblade". The whole scheme is designed to upset Paddy's receptionist, Jo Stiles (Roxanne Pallett), who had invented the sexy stranger to boost Paddy's confidence. After the joke is played out, Toni reveals herself to be the fun-loving cousin of local boy, Danny Daggert and settled into life in the village. She takes a job in the Woolpack after impressing landlady Diane Sugden (Elizabeth Estensen), and works behind the bar. She has a one-night stand with Ivan Jones (Daniel Brocklebank) much to Nicola Blackstock's (Nicola Wheeler) fury. Toni sets her sights on Paddy's business partner, Hari Prasad (John Nayagam) and flirts with him, hoping for a date. Toni is oblivious to Paddy's feelings for her and when he confesses she accuses him of trying to ruin her chances with Hari. Things are awkward for a while but she and Paddy come through it.

Toni regrets rejecting Paddy when he becomes close to Del Dingle (Hayley Tamaddon), and she realizes she does have feelings for him and tries to win him back. Del confronts Toni in the Woolpack kitchen and warns her off Paddy. When Toni refuses, a fight ensues, and Toni is severely burned with hot fat. Despite being an accident, Paddy is horrified at Del's actions and dumps her. Toni and Paddy get together and eventually get engaged after Paddy proposes, but the proposal is revealed as accidental and the two split. Toni makes peace with Paddy and Del before leaving.

References

See also
 List of Emmerdale characters (2005)

Emmerdale characters
Television characters introduced in 2005
Female characters in television
Fictional Black British people
Fictional bartenders